Northern Division or North Division can refer to:

Sports
 Northern Division (Rugby Union) Leagues of England
 Queensland Rugby League Northern Division
 Southern League Northern Division of the Southern Football League in England
 FA Women's Premier League Northern Division in England
 AFC North, a division of the American Football Conference in the National Football League (NFL)
 NFC North, a division of the National Football Conference in the NFL
 North Division (NHL), a division of the National Hockey League
 North Division (CFL), a former division of the Canadian Football League
 Northern Division (AFL), a former division of the Arena Football League

Government and politics
 Northern Division, Fiji
 Northern Division (New Zealand electorate), a former electorate of the Parliament of New Zealand
 Northern Division (Travancore), an administrative subdivision of the former princely state of Travancore in southern India

Other uses
 División del Norte, a division that fought during the Mexican Revolution
 Northern Division (Syrian rebel group), a division of the Free Syrian Army

See also

 Canadian Division (NHL), the northern division of the 1920s-1930s in the National Hockey League
 National League East, a division of the National League in Major League Baseball that was, in a geographical sense, formerly much closer to being a northern as opposed to an eastern division
 North Conference (disambiguation)
 Central Division (disambiguation)
 Eastern Division (disambiguation)
 Southern Division (disambiguation)
 Western Division (disambiguation)
 
 
 
 Division (disambiguation)
 Northern (disambiguation)
 North (disambiguation)